Hawkwright Creek is a stream in the U.S. state of South Dakota.

Hawkwright Creek has the name of J. N. "Hawk" Wright, a local cattleman.

See also
List of rivers of South Dakota

References

Rivers of Custer County, South Dakota
Rivers of Fall River County, South Dakota
Rivers of South Dakota